Minimum wage in Kazakhstan is set by a law that established the nationwide minimum wage.  According to Kazakh sources, minimum wage in Kazakhstan in 2010 was 14592 tenge (about $38 USD) per month. After that it increased to 21364 tenge (about US$55)  in 2015.
The current minimum wage in Kazakhstan, which was set on January 1, 2017, equals 24,459 tenge (about US$63).
There is a lot of discussion about the low level of minimum wages in Kazakhstan. Because of that, the opposition party in Kazakhstan, Democratic Choice of Kazakhstan, has criticised the president of the country, Nursultan Nazarbayev.

The Minimum Wages in Kazakhstan increased to 42500 KZT/Month in 2019.

References

Kazakhstan
Economy of Kazakhstan